Olpherts or Olphert is a surname. Notable people with the surname include: 

David Olphert (born 1969), Irish cricketer
Derrell Olpherts (born 1992), English rugby player
William Olpherts (1832-1902), British Indian Army officer, recipient of the Victoria Cross

See also
Olphert Stanfield (1869-1952), Irish footballer